North Hall may refer to:

North Hall (Gainesville, Florida), historic building
North Hall (University of Wisconsin), first building on University of Wisconsin campus
North Hall High School, high school in Hall County, Georgia
North Hall-River Falls State Normal School, historic building in Wisconsin

Architectural disambiguation pages